Amtala is a census town within the jurisdiction of the Bishnupur police station in the Bishnupur II CD block in the Alipore Sadar subdivision of the South 24 Parganas district in the Indian state of West Bengal.

Geography

Area overview
The Alipore Sadar subdivision is the most urbanized part of the South 24 Parganas district. 59.85% of the population lives in the urban areas and 40.15% lives in the rural areas. In the southern portion of the subdivision (shown in the map alongside) there are 15 census towns. The entire district is situated in the Ganges Delta and the subdivision, on the east bank of the Hooghly River, is an alluvial stretch, with industrial development.

Note: The map alongside presents some of the notable locations in the subdivision. All places marked in the map are linked in the larger full screen map.

Location

Bishnupur, Kanyanagar, Amtala, Ramkrishnapur, Kriparampur and Chak Enayetnagar (a little away) form a cluster of census towns, as per the map of the Bishnupur I CD block on page 207 and the map of the Bishnupur II CD block on page 233 of the District Census Handbook 2011 for the South 24 Parganas.

Demographics
According to the 2011 Census of India, Amtala had a total population of 8,765, of which 4,416 (50%) were males and 4,349 (50%) were females. There were 829 persons in the age range of 0 to 6 years. The total number of literates was 6,896 (86.89% of the population over 6 years).

Infrastructure
According to the District Census Handbook 2011, Amtala covered an area of 1.53 km2. Among the civic amenities, it had 22 km roads with both open and covered drains. The protected water supply involved over-head tank. It had 200 domestic electric connections, 1,500 commercial connections and 100 road light points. Among the medical facilities it had 2 charitable hospitals/ nursing homes and 2 medicine shops. Among the educational facilities it had were 6 primary schools, the nearest middle, secondary and senior secondary schools at Pallishree 1 km away, the nearest general degree college at Vidyanagar 5 km away. It had 4 recognised shorthand, typewriting and vocational training institutes, 1 non-formal education centre (Sarba Siksha Abhiyan). Among the social, recreational and cultural facilities, it had 1 public library. Three important commodities it produced were dry flowers, plywood and brush. It had branches of 9 nationalised banks, 6 private commercial banks, 1 co-operative bank and 1 non-agricultural credit society.

Transport
Amtala is on the National Highway 12.

Education
Udairampur Pallisree Sikshayatan is a higher secondary school established in 1946.

Central Model School, Amtala, is a higher secondary school affiliated to the Central Board of Secondary Education - CBSE, Delhi.

ST. JOSEPH'S BRIGHT SCHOOL, Amtala, is a higher secondary school affiliated to the West Bengal Board of Secondary Education - WBBSE, West Bengal.

Healthcare
Amtala Rural Hospital, with 50 beds, at Amtala, is the major government medical facility in the Bishnupur II CD block.

References

Cities and towns in South 24 Parganas district
Neighbourhoods in Kolkata
Kolkata Metropolitan Area